Kise Mill Bridge Historic District, also known as Mickley's Mill, is a national historic district located at Newberry Township in York County, Pennsylvania. The district includes one contributing building, two contributing sites, and four contributing structures.  It includes the miller's house (c. 1810), the buried foundations of a stone grist mill building erected in 1840 on the site of a log mill established about 1790, portions of the head and tailrace, an exposed sawmill foundation, and mill pond dam.  The miller's house is a 2 1/2-story, three bay, banked sandstone dwelling. An early 19th century log house was moved to the site in 1973, and attached to the miller's house.

It was listed on the National Register of Historic Places in 1980. Also in the district is the Kise Mill Bridge, listed in 1988.

References 

Historic districts on the National Register of Historic Places in Pennsylvania
Historic districts in York County, Pennsylvania
National Register of Historic Places in York County, Pennsylvania